The anti-gender movement is an international movement which opposes what it refers to as "gender ideology", "gender theory" or "genderism". The concepts cover a variety of issues and have no coherent definition. Members of the anti-gender movement include right-wingers and the far right, right-wing populists, conservatives, and Christian fundamentalists. Members of the anti-gender movement oppose some LGBT rights, some reproductive rights, government gender policies, gender equality, gender mainstreaming and gender studies departments. Anti-gender rhetoric has seen increasing circulation in trans-exclusionary radical feminist discourse since 2016.

The term gender ideology has been described by the academics Stefanie Mayer and Birgit Sauer as an "empty signifier" and by Agnieszka Graff as a "catch-all term for all that conservative Catholics despise". The idea of gender ideology has been described by scholars as a moral panic or conspiracy theory, as it alleges that there is a secret cabal out to undermine society. A report by the European Parliament linked the rise of the anti-gender movement in Europe to disinformation campaigns that are sponsored in large part by Russia.

The movement derives from Catholic theology and can be dated to the late twentieth century, but the protests that brought the movement to attention did not start until around 2012–2013. The historian Andrea Pető states that the anti-gender movement is not a form of classical anti-feminism but instead "a fundamentally new phenomenon that was launched to establish a new world order".

Terminology

The phrase anti-gender is seldom used in English-speaking communities; it is primarily used in other language communities to attach a "foreign" label to progressive policies connected to gender, sexuality, or reproductive freedom.

The concept of gender ideology does not have a coherent definition and covers a variety of issues; for this reason, it has been described by academics Stefanie Mayer and Birgit Sauer as an "empty signifier" and by Agnieszka Graff as a catch-all term "for all that conservative Catholics despise".  
The term gender ideology and related terms gender theory and genderism, used interchangeably, are not equivalent to the academic discipline of gender studies, within which significant controversies and disagreements exist. Anti-gender proponents are often unaware of these debates and disagreements. 
Elizabeth Corredor writes: "gender ideology serves as both a political and epistemological counterclaim to emancipatory conceptions of gender, sex, and sexuality". She adds that the anti-gender movement combines "gender ideology" rhetoric with attempts to exploit the existing divisions within LGBT and feminist movements. The movement accuses various actors of being bearers of "gender ideology", including "liberal, green or leftist politicians, women's rights activists, LGBT activists, gender policy officers of public administrations, and gender studies scholars".

Origin theories
There are various theories about when and where the anti-gender movement originated.

International conferences in the mid-1990s
Most scholars studying the anti-gender movement have dated its origins to 1990s discussions within the Catholic Church to counter the results of the United Nations' 1994 International Conference on Population and Development and the 1995 World Conference on Women, following which the UN began to recognize sexual and reproductive rights. The Holy See feared that this recognition would lead to abortion being seen as a human right, delegitimization of motherhood, and the normalization of homosexuality. The term gender "was understood by the Holy See as a strategic means to attack and destabilize the natural family". In 1997, American anti-abortion journalist Dale O’Leary, who is affiliated to the Opus Dei, wrote a book titled The Gender Agenda: "the Gender Agenda sails into communities not as a tall ship, but as a submarine, determined to reveal as little of itself as possible". In Catholic thought, the concept of gender ideology emerged from John Paul II's theology of the body, in which the sexes are held to be different and complementary. Although the ideas of the anti-gender movement were developed by 2003, protests related to the movement first emerged in most European countries around 2012–2013. Although it is still promoted by Catholic actors, the anti-gender movement spread more generally throughout the right-wing by 2019.

1980s Church origin
Alternately, the anti-gender movement is dated to the early 1980s when Cardinal Joseph Ratzinger, the later Pope Benedict XVI, noticed that feminist books arguing that gender was socially constructed were bestsellers in Germany and noticed changes in German law allowing transgender people to legally change their gender. Researcher Mary Anne Case therefore argues that "Trans rights claims were, together with feminist claims, thus a foundational component, not a recent addition, to the Vatican’s sphere of concern around 'gender' and to the focusing of that concern on developments in secular law."

Later developments

Trans-exclusionary radical feminism

Pearce et al. said that the concept of gender ideology "saw increasing circulation in trans-exclusionary radical feminist discourse" from around 2016. Claire Thurlow noted that "despite efforts to obscure the point, gender critical feminism continues to rely on transphobic tropes, moral panics and essentialist understandings of men and women. These factors also continue to link trans-exclusionary feminism to anti-feminist reactionary politics and other ‘anti-gender’ movements."

Foreign influence
A report commissioned by the European Parliament found that anti-gender activity in Europe was funded to a large degree by Russian and American actors.

Central figures and issues

According to Łukasz Wawrowski, it is not possible to have a scientific discourse between gender studies scholars and anti-gender proponents, because for the former gender is a scientific concept that can be researched and falsified, whereas anti-gender proponents derive their arguments from transcendent truths handed down by God, which are not subject to empirical verification. 

Members of the anti-gender movement oppose some reproductive rights, particularly abortion, as well as some LGBT rights, especially same-sex marriage, along with some campaigns against gender-based violence. They may also campaign against anti-bullying programs, sex education in schools, and gender studies in higher education. According to Kováts, not all the movements fitting under the "anti-gender" label (by opposing "gender" or "gender ideology") are overtly anti-feminist or anti-LGBT, and the anti-gender movement is a novel phenomenon distinct from previous anti-feminism and homophobia. The anti-gender movement is not synonymous with the far-right, as not all far-right movements espouse anti-gender views, and anti-gender themes extend beyond the far-right.

"Gender ideology"
The anti-gender movement often use the term "gender ideology". Anti-gender activists may portray the EU and international organizations as manipulated by lobbies, such as American billionaires, Freemasons, feminists, or Jews. To promote the idea that gender is a foreign concept imposed by corrupt elites, they often use the English word gender, rather than a translation into the local language.

Proponents present themselves as the defenders of the freedoms of speech, thought, and conscience against the "gender ideology", which they label as "totalitarian".

Some in the anti-gender movement consider "gender ideology" to be a totalitarian ideology, worse than Communism or Nazism. This is allegedly pushed by a secret cabal or foreign entities (such as the European Union, World Health Organization, or United Nations) for the purpose of weakening, undermining, or destroying families, the Catholic Church, the nation, or Western civilization.

Related concepts
According to sociologists Roman Kuhar and David Paternotte, "the invention of 'gender ideology' is closely connected to debates within the Catholic Church". Pope Francis has stated that "gender ideology" would undermine the Catholic Church's position on gender complementarity, comparing it to nuclear weapons, and said it was one of the "Herods that destroy, that plot designs of death, that disfigure the face of man and woman, destroying creation". In 2019, the Catholic Church released the first major document dealing specifically with "gender ideology", which states that there are only two biologically determined genders or sexes. According to Corredor,

The anti-gender movement is closely related to right-wing populism, nationalism, and the Christian right. According to Kuhar and Paternotte, "anti-gender campaigns are [not] the direct consequence of the right-wing populist wave, but the shift towards the Right reinforces these campaigns and provides them with new supporters who took over a concept of 'gender ideology' which shares some ideological structures with right-wing populist ideology". In line with their populist framing, referendums are often used to secure the outcomes desired by the anti-gender movement.

Analyses and responses
It is disputed the extent to which the anti-gender movement is a reaction to events and other movements, or a proactive movement attempting to create social change. Hande Eslen-Ziya argues that the anti-gender movement relies on what she calls "troll science," that she describes as "(distorted) scientific arguments moulded into populist discourse, creating an alternative narrative on the conceptions of gender equality."

According to Marta Rawłuszko, the anti-gender movement is, in part, a backlash against the devolution of power from democratically elected national governments to unelected equality bodies and international organizations, such as the European Union, which demand changes. Because these policies are not approved by voters or their elected representatives, they generate a democratic deficit. She notes that "gender equality policies have been implemented without engaging a wider audience or public debate".

However, Paternotte rejects the idea that the anti-gender movement is a backlash, writing that the idea is "conceptually flawed, empirically weak and politically problematic", because comparative research has shown that in different countries, the anti-gender activism is "sparked by extremely different issues".

The emergence and success of anti-gender movements is considered by political scientist Eszter Kováts to be a symptom of a deeper underlying socioeconomic, political, and cultural crisis of liberal democracy and a reaction to neoliberalism. Similarly, political scientist Birgit Sauer refers to these movements as, among other things, a reaction to deregulation, precarization of labor, the erosion of the welfare state and the widening of the gap between the rich and poor. In the journal LuXemburg in 2018, sociologist Weronika Grzebalska and political scientists Eszter Kováts and Andrea Pető analyze the term gender as the "symbolic glue" of the anti-gender movement, which unites different political and religious actors who would otherwise not cooperate with each other. They view the "gender ideology" that these actors mobilize against as a metaphor for the insecurity and unfairness produced by the neoliberal socioeconomic order.

The idea of gender ideology has been described as a moral panic or conspiracy theory. According to two political psychologists writing for The Conversation, the conspiracy theory contributed to a debate in Poland in 2020 about "whether the coronavirus pandemic is a punishment for gender theory". An Ipsos survey in October 2019 found that a plurality of Polish men under 40 believe that "the LGBT movement and gender ideology" is the "biggest threat facing them in the 21st century".

Those said to support gender ideology are delegitimized, negating pluralism and undermining liberal democracy, in a similar way to the far-right.

Pető argues that "The anti-gender movement is not merely another offshoot of centuries-old anti-feminism... The anti-gender movement is a fundamentally new phenomenon that was launched to establish a new world order." She also argues that the movement "is saturated with hatred"—citing online harassment against gender researchers—and argues that it "attacks liberalism and therefore democracy".
In 2021 the philosopher Judith Butler described the anti-gender movement as a fascist trend and cautioned self-declared feminists against allying with such movements in targeting trans, non-binary, and genderqueer people. In a 2019 paper Butler argued that "the confusion of discourses is part of what constitutes the fascist structure and appeal of at least some of these [anti-gender] movements. One can oppose gender as a cultural import from the North at the same time that one can see that very opposition as a social movement against further colonization of the South. The result is not a turn to the Left, but an embrace of ethno-nationalism."

Marie Wittenius of the Gunda Werner Institute for feminism and gender democracy argues that the term "gender ideology" "functions as a broad projection area for racism, anti-Semitism, homophobia and transphobia, ethnicnationalist ideas as well as hostility towards elites."

In August 2021, the Council of Europe Commissioner for Human Rights Dunja Mijatović said the anti-gender movement are "instrumentalising existing societal prejudices and verbally attacking LGBTI people to achieve political objectives for their own benefit" and said the targeting of "LGBTI people for political gain is a costly strategy which harms the lives and well-being of those affected and undermines social cohesion in general." The Commissioner said that "by permeating the political scene, the anti-gender movements are increasingly well-placed to erode the protection of human rights in Europe" and concluded that "by standing up for LGBTI people, we defend the equal human dignity of all, protect our societies' wellbeing and the strength of our precious human rights system."

In February 2022 the European Parliament Committee on Women's Rights and Gender Equality organised a public hearing on "Countering the anti-gender movement", highlighting the anti-gender movement as a threat to gender equality.

By region

The anti-gender movement emerged in Europe in the early 2010s and, as of 2019, was making headway in Latin America. The movement is transnational, with campaigns in different countries borrowing strategies and rhetoric from other countries. However, in individual countries the anti-gender movement overlaps with appeals to nationalism and national sovereignty.

Besides Catholicism, anti-gender rhetoric is used by other Christians, Confucians, Hindus, Muslims, and Jews.

Europe
Before the emergence of the anti-gender movement, activists and scholars believed that Europe was on an inexorable course towards complete gender equality and full LGBT rights, serious opposition to which was deemed a holdover from the past or else a phenomenon confined to Eastern Europe and Catholic countries. The anti-gender movement proved this perception to be incorrect. Since the 1990s, the European Commission has made eligibility for funding from the Structural Funds and Cohesion Fund conditional on local gender equality policies, which led to rapid changes after Poland joined the European Union in 2004.

In February 2019, the European Parliament passed a resolution against the "backlash in women’s rights and gender equality in the EU".

France 

The anti-gender movement in France is spearheaded by Farida Belghoul and La Manif pour tous (LMPT), a protest movement which originated in early 2013 to oppose same-sex marriage in France and pivoted to opposing equality curricula after same-sex marriage was legalized in May 2013. The anti-gender movement in France has spread false rumors and hoaxes, such as the claim that masturbation is being taught in French kindergartens. Professor  analyzes LMPT as a populist, post-truth movement.

Germany 

In Germany, right-wing extremists and right-wing populists mobilized against the concept of "gender madness," which was characterized as a "weapon" against "the German people" in a 2013 call by neo-Nazis.

Even outside the extreme right, there has been critical discussion of gender mainstreaming since 2006, when Eva Herman commented on the role of women in society and the Frankfurter Allgemeine Zeitung debated "political gender reassignment". Right-wing extremists used this as a prelude to a targeted campaign against gender mainstreaming.

Additionally, since 2013, the fundamentalist Christian protest alliance  has mobilized against same-sex marriage and gender mainstreaming.

Hungary
According to Eszter Kováts and Andrea Pető, writing in 2017, there was "no significant anti-gender movement" in the country, but "a palpable anti-gender discourse", especially in the later 2010s, which to date had only sporadically intersected with the national public debate. They write that the Hungarian anti-gender discourse emerged in 2008, when a textbook was published that was criticized by a Fidesz MP. The politician said that the textbook contained "gender ideology" and that "the greatest danger of this trend is that society will lose its sexual identity". In politics, the anti-gender discourse first attained prominence in 2010, when the left-wing government inserted a sentence into the national curriculum stating that early childhood educators should "deliberately avoid any strengthening of gender stereotypes and facilitate the dismantling of the prejudices concerning the social equality of genders". Right-wing media gave the change much coverage; it was alleged to promote "gender ideology".

Italy
Anti-gender in Italy has been sponsored by Lega Nord party as well as the groups Pro Vita (associated with the neo-fascist party New Force) and Manif pour Tous Italia, later called Generazione Famiglia. In the 2018 Italian general election, Lega Nord placed Catholic representatives on its electoral lists, sealing an anti-gender alliance.

Lithuania
The 2020 Lithuanian parliamentary elections and the formation of coalition between the Homeland Union and Freedom Party, which shares a positive stance on LGBT-related policies, led to the formation of anti-gender movements such as the Lithuanian Family Movement and political parties like the National Alliance.

Norway
Gender studies scholar Elisabeth L. Engebretsen has identified groups such as the Norwegian branch of Women's Declaration International and LLH2019, a self-declared sister organization of LGB Alliance, as key anti-gender actors in Norway. According to Engebretsen these groups are part of a "complex threat to democracy."

Poland

In late 2013, the term gender, which had been confined to academic discourse, became popularized as part of an anti-gender campaign by the right-wing and the Catholic Church. The campaign against "gender ideology" is promoted by the ruling, national-conservative PiS party, by the Catholic Church's hierarchy, and more radically nationalist groups with which PiS has a fluid boundary: All-Polish Youth, the National Rebirth of Poland, and the National-Radical Camp. Sociologists  and Pavel Żuk write that: "The right in Poland perceives both feminist and homosexual circles as a threat to the national identity associated with the Catholic religion and as a threat to the traditional family model and social order." Anti-LGBT rhetoric from the Polish right increased following the conclusion of the 2015 European migrant crisis, during which anti-migrant rhetoric was prominent. With anti-gender rhetoric, the LGBT community served as the scapegoat or demonized enemy required by populist politics.

A 2020 survey of a representative sample of 1,000 Poles found that 30% believed in the existence of a gender conspiracy, "defined as a secret plan to destroy Christian tradition partly by taking control over public media". The survey found that belief in the gender conspiracy did not correlate with religiosity; it was strongly associated with the belief that the Catholic Church should occupy a privileged position in society and rejection of LGBT people as neighbors. Marta Rawłuszko suggests that Polish people may be prone to finding conspiracies because of the actual plots during communist rule.
In June 2020, Polish president Andrzej Duda of PiS drew attention when he called LGBT an "ideology" and a form of "neo-Bolshevism", ahead of the 2020 Polish presidential election.

Bulgaria
In February 2023 the Bulgarian Socialist Party called for a national referendum on "Gender Ideology". Later in the month, the party praised a Supreme Court ruling that only biological sex can be listed on government documents and could not be changed.

North America

United States
In 2021, Puerto Rico experienced a march against the introduction of a "Gender Perspective curriculum" in public schools that was created under former Governor Alejandro García Padilla and being enacted under Governor Pedro Pierluisi. The marchers, who numbered in the tens of thousands, described the event as marching against "Gender Ideology". Speakers included Bishop Daniel Fernández Torres, political scientist , along with other religious leaders.

Latin America

Brazil 
Former President of Brazil Jair Bolsonaro has characterized "gender ideologists" as a force that is opposed to conservative Christianity. He has also said that he wants to ban "gender ideology in schools".

Colombia
During the 2016 Colombian peace agreement referendum, evangelical Christian pressure groups and right-wing politicians that opposed the peace agreement argued that protections for LGBT people in the treaty were "an instrument to impose gender ideology". This helped motivate much of the evangelical electorate to oppose the agreement, which was ultimately rejected by voters, 50.22% (No) to 49.78% (Yes).

See also 

 Anti-Gender Campaigns in Europe - non-fiction book on the movement
 Anti-LGBT rhetoric
 Complementarianism
 Discrimination against non-binary people
 Discrimination against transgender people
 Gender and politics
 Gender empowerment
 Gender essentialism
 LGBT-free zone
 Sociology of gender
 Transphobia
 TERF

References
Notes

Footnotes

Sources

Further reading

External links
Anti-gender politics at London School of Economics blogs
Responding to anti-gender at ILGA-Europe

21st-century social movements
Anti-LGBT sentiment
Criticism of feminism
LGBT-related conspiracy theories
Moral panic
Opposition to feminism
Opposition to sex education
Scares
Social conservatism
Conspiracy theories involving religion
Gender and society
LGBT and religion